Konotop  is a village in the administrative district of Gmina Kolsko, within Nowa Sól County, Lubusz Voivodeship, in western Poland.

The village has a population of 1,400.

The name of the village is of Polish origin and comes from the word koń, which means "horse".

Notable residents
 Karl Wilhelm von Dieskau (1701–1777), Prussian general
 Hans Sigismund von Lestwitz (1718–1788), Prussian general

References

Villages in Nowa Sól County